Malcolm John Dick (born 3 January 1941) is a former New Zealand rugby union player and administrator. A wing three-quarter, Dick represented Auckland at a provincial level, and was a member of the New Zealand national side, the All Blacks, from 1963 to 1970. He played 55 matches for the All Blacks including 15 internationals.

Later active in the administration of the game, Malcolm served as president of the Auckland Rugby Union from 1981 to 1983 and chairman of that union's management committee from 1984 to 1990. He was a member of the New Zealand Rugby Union council between 1986 and 1992, including a period as deputy chairman. He was also the manager of the All Blacks on their 1987 tour of Japan.

References

1941 births
Living people
Rugby union players from Auckland
People educated at Auckland Grammar School
New Zealand rugby union players
New Zealand international rugby union players
Auckland rugby union players
Rugby union wings
New Zealand Rugby Football Union officials